Mícheál Mac Donncha (born Michael McConkey) is an Irish Sinn Féin politician who served as the Lord Mayor of Dublin from 2017 to 2018. He has been a Dublin City Councillor since 2014.

He was co-opted onto Dublin City Council in 2011, to fill a vacancy caused by the resignation of Killian Forde. He was elected in 2014 for the Beaumont-Donaghmede local electoral area. He contested the 2016 general election as a Sinn Féin candidate in the Dublin Bay North constituency, one of two party candidates, his running mate Denise Mitchell being elected.

In April 2018, prior to attending a conference in Ramallah, on the status of the city of Jerusalem, Israel announced he would be prohibited from entering Israel to transit to occupied Palestine. Mac Donncha was able to enter Israel and travel to Ramallah. It was later discovered that Israeli officials had mistaken an image caption Ardmhéara Mícheál MacDonncha – as his full name. Ardmheára is the Irish for Lord Mayor.

He was editor of An Phoblacht from 1990 to 1996. From 1997 to 2014, he served as Parliamentary Assistant to Sinn Féin TD Caoimhghín Ó Caoláin and for much of that time was manager of the Sinn Féin Oireachtas team. He is the author of a centenary history of Sinn Féin 'A Century of Struggle' (2005).

Mac Donncha caused controversy in 2015 when he called the people who run Irish rugby West Brits (a derogatory term) because the Irish Rugby team uses "Ireland's Call" when playing outside the country.  

Mac Donncha as a child actor played a young version of the actor Marty Feldman in the 1976 film The Last Remake of Beau Geste.

References

St Fintan's High School
20th-century Irish politicians
21st-century Irish politicians
Sinn Féin politicians
Lord Mayors of Dublin
Alumni of University College Dublin
Living people
People educated at St. Fintan's High School
Year of birth missing (living people)